The Wharf Revue is a series of musical comedy revues presented by the Sydney Theatre Company. Each show features four comedians – usually Jonathan Biggins, Phillip Scott and Drew Forsythe, accompanied by a female performer – satirising media personalities and political events in sketches and songs. The music and lyrics are largely written by Scott. Female Wharf Revue performers have included Amanda Bishop, Genevieve Lemon and Helen Dallimore (filling in).

The revue has become something of a Sydney cultural institution.

Past shows
Oct to Dec 2019: Unr-Dact-D 
Oct to Dec 2018: Deja Revue 
Oct to Dec 2017: The Patriotic Rag
Dec 2016 Back with a Bite 
Dec 2015 Celebrating 15 years
Dec 2014 Open for Business 
Dec 2013 Whoops! 
Dec 2012 Red Wharf: Beyond The Rings of Satire
Dec 2011 Debt Defying Acts
Dec 2010 Not Quite out of the Woods
Dec 2009 Pennies from Kevin
Dec 2008 Waiting for Garnaut
2007 Beware of the Dogma
8 November – 9 December 2006: Revue Sans Frontières
17 July – 15 August 2006: Best We Forget
16 November – 23 December 2005: Stuff All Happens
5–30 April 2005: Concert for Tax Relief
June 2003: Sunday in Iraq with George
Free Petrol

See also

Culture of Sydney

References

Australian comedy
2000 introductions